KEVA (1240 AM) was a radio station broadcasting from Evanston, Wyoming. KEVA had been on the air in southwestern Wyoming since 1953, and was one of the area's oldest radio stations. It offered local programming throughout the day as well, including news, classifieds, and weather.

KEVA's tower and studio were located on Airport Road just outside town.

Initially as a daytime-only radio station in 1953, KEVA ceased broadcasting July 2, 2014 due to failure of their transmitter. Attempts to repair it were unsuccessful. Attempts to find a new owner and money for a new transmitter were also unsuccessful. It was taken off the air. KEVA's license was canceled on May 3, 2017, for failure to pay debts it owed to the Federal Communications Commission (FCC).

References

External links
FCC Station Search Details: DKEVA (Facility ID: 20028)
 (covering 1952-1981 as KLUK / KEVA)

EVA
Radio stations established in 1953
1953 establishments in Wyoming
Radio stations disestablished in 2017
2017 disestablishments in Wyoming
Uinta County, Wyoming
Defunct radio stations in the United States
EVA